Rwekunye–Apac–Aduku–Lira–Kitgum–Musingo Road is a road in the Northern Region of Uganda, connecting the towns of Masindi Port in Kiryandongo District to Apac in Apac District, Lira in Lira District, Acholibur in Pader District, Kitgum in Kitgum District, and Musingo in Lamwo District at the international border with South Sudan.

Location
The coordinates of the road near Lira are 2°22'27.0"N, 32°56'04.0"E (Latitude:2.374167; Longitude:32.934444).

Upgrading to bitumen
In 2009, the Ugandan government commissioned a feasibility study and a detailed engineering design for this road and for the  Acholibur–Gulu–Olwiyo Road, both in northern Uganda. The reports became available in 2013.

In February 2015, the upgrade from unsealed gravel surface to class II bitumen surface began. President Yoweri Museveni commissioned the start of the project on 21 February 2015. Work is expected to last three years. The road project is fully funded by the Ugandan government. The work on the Rwekunye to Acholibur section of the road will be commissioned at a later date.

On 21 October 2020, President Museveni flagged off two other sections of the same road. The  Rwekunye–Apac section was awarded to Sadeem Al Kuwait General Trading & Contracting Company, of Kuwait. The Apac–Lira–Purang’a section, measuring ) was awarded to Gulsan Insaat Sanayi Turizm Nakliyat Ve Tecaret A.S. of Turkey. The budgeted cost of renovating these two sections is USh735 billion (approximately (US$201 million).

In February 2022, UNRA officials estimated the scope of work on this road as 80 percent complete.

See also
 List of roads in Uganda
 Economy of Uganda
 Transport in Uganda

References

External links
 Uganda National Road Authority Homepage

 

Roads in Uganda
Lamwo District
Kitgum District
Pader District
Lira District
Apac District
Kiryandongo District
Acholi sub-region
Lango sub-region
Bunyoro sub-region
Northern Region, Uganda
Western Region, Uganda